Thomas Walter Turrentine, Jr. (April 22, 1928 – May 13, 1997) was a swing and hard bop trumpeter and composer who was active between the 1940s and the 1960s. He rarely worked as a bandleader, and was known for his work as a sideman with drummer Max Roach and his younger brother, the saxophonist Stanley Turrentine.

Biography
Born in Pittsburgh, Pennsylvania, Turrentine played in the bands of Benny Carter, Earl Bostic, Charles Mingus, Billy Eckstine, Dizzy Gillespie, and Count Basie. He later recorded with Sonny Clark, Lou Donaldson, and his brother Tommy's bands. His working relationship with Max Roach was spawned in part when he joined the Max Roach Quintet in the late 1950s. Turrentine was also adept on the piano at chord blockings and was a compositional exponent of Thelonious Monk's earlier chordal voicings. His bebop compositions combined a sophisticated and emotional fusion and poignant lyricism reminiscent of Benny Golson and with the passionate, spirited influence of the Clifford Brown/ Max Roach Quintet.

While his brother had a successful career and recorded a number of albums over his lifetime, Tommy only recorded one album under his name before retiring in the 1960s. In the 1970s he lived on the ground floor of a brownstone with his wife, Jane on West 82nd Street in New York City, a street which during that period had a number of jazz luminaries living along its blocks between Broadway and Central Park, including Tommy Flanagan and Pharoah Sanders.

Tommy Turrentine was rarely active after the 1970s. In the summer of 1979, he was one of several star trumpeters (including John Faddis and others) who appeared at the Village Gate for an all-star tribute to Blue Mitchell who had died earlier that year. Turrentine also appeared on the 1989 album Blue Delight by keyboardist Sun Ra.

He died of cancer at the age of 69.

Discography

As leader
1960: Tommy Turrentine (Time Records, 1960) - with Stanley Turrentine, trombonist Julian Priester, pianist Horace Parlan, bassist Bob Boswell, drummer Max Roach

As sideman
With Ahmed Abdul-Malik
The Music of Ahmed Abdul-Malik (New Jazz, 1961)
Sounds of Africa (New Jazz, 1961)
With Paul Chambers
1st Bassman (VeeJay, 1960)
With Sonny Clark
Leapin' and Lopin' (Blue Note, 1961)
With Lou Donaldson
The Natural Soul (Blue Note, 1962)
Signifyin' (Argo, 1963)
With Booker Ervin
The Book Cooks (Bethlehem, 1960)
With Dexter Gordon
Landslide (Blue Note, 1961-62 [1980])
With Rufus Jones
Five on Eight (Cameo, 1964)
With Philly Joe Jones
Mean What You Say (Sonet, 1977)
With Abbey Lincoln
Abbey Is Blue (Riverside, 1959)
With Jackie McLean
A Fickle Sonance (Blue Note, 1961)
With Horace Parlan
Speakin' My Piece (Blue Note, 1960)
On the Spur of the Moment (Blue Note 1961)
With John Patton
Blue John (Blue Note, 1963)
With Max Roach
 Quiet as It's Kept (Mercury, 1959)
Moon Faced and Starry Eyed (Mercury, 1959)
Long as You're Living (Enja, 1960 [1984])
Parisian Sketches (Mercury, 1960)
With Archie Shepp
Mama Too Tight (Impulse!, 1966)
With Sun Ra
Blue Delight (A&M, 1989)
With Stanley Turrentine
Comin' Your Way (Blue Note, 1961)
Jubilee Shout!!! (Blue Note, 1962)
A Bluish Bag (Blue Note, 1967)
The Man with the Sad Face (Fantasy, 1976)

References

1928 births
1997 deaths
American jazz trumpeters
American male trumpeters
Musicians from Pittsburgh
20th-century American musicians
20th-century trumpeters
Jazz musicians from Pennsylvania
20th-century American male musicians
American male jazz musicians
20th-century African-American musicians